The flowering shrub Acalypha californica is known as the California copperleaf, and sometimes by the older name Pringle three-seeded mercury. It is the only Acalypha species native to California, where it is most abundant in the hills of San Diego County. It is a member of the chaparral plant community.

The plant bears hairy, juicy, toothed leaves which despite the plant's common name are light green, never copper in color. Each flower is made up of a staminate part, which appears as a long spike of tiny red and pink bracts, and a pistillate part at the base of the spike, which is a cup made up of green bracts bearing the ovary.

Citations

External links
CalFlora Database — detail photos.
Jepson Manual Treatment; Acalypha californica
USDA Plants Profile for Acalypha californica

californica
Flora of California
Flora of Baja California
Flora of Arizona
Flora of the Sonoran Deserts
Flora of the California desert regions
Natural history of the Colorado Desert
Natural history of the Peninsular Ranges
Plants described in 1844
Flora without expected TNC conservation status